Taylor School District or Taylor Public Schools was a school district headquartered in Taylor, Arkansas. It operated Taylor Elementary School and Taylor High School.

On July 1, 2004, it consolidated with the Emerson School District to form the Emerson-Taylor School District (now the Emerson-Taylor-Bradley School District).

References

Further reading
Maps of the Taylor district:
 Map of Arkansas School Districts pre-July 1, 2004
  (Download)

External links
 

Education in Columbia County, Arkansas
Defunct school districts in Arkansas
2004 disestablishments in Arkansas
School districts disestablished in 2004